François Daneels (born 1921 Tubize, Belgium—20 April 2010 Tubize, Belgium) was an internationally renowned virtuoso classical saxophonist, a prolific composer, and music educator from Belgium. From 1954 to 1981, Daneels was professor of saxophone at his alma mater, the Royal Conservatory of Brussels.

Education & career 
Daneels studied music at the Royal Conservatory of Brussels, earning First Prize with Great Distinction in 1939. He had been a distinguished professor at the Conservatory since 1954. His performed internationally, including in the United States, Germany, Switzerland, Canada, Hungary, former Czechoslovakia, and Denmark. More than forty compositions for solo saxophone were specifically written for him. Daneels also founded the Belgian Saxophone Quartet in 1953 and took it on a world tour that year. He also founded the Belgian Saxophone Quintet, the Belgium Saxophone Septet, and the Belgium Saxophone Octet. He is widely known for having founded the Belgian School of Saxophone, which he described as a blend of the French School of Marcel Mule and the American School—a mixture characterized by the quality of sound, rhythmic rigor, observance of nuances, and respect of the text of pieces studied. When Daneels retired from the Royal Conservatory of Brussels in 1981, one of his former students, Alain Crépin, succeeded him.

Daneels founded the School of Music of Tubize (l'école de musique de Tubize) in 1962, and, in addition to his duties at the Royal Conservatory of Brussels, served as director and professor there until 1974. The school has since been elevated to academy status, and, in 2004, was renamed Académie François Daneels.

Daneels was the founding president of International Adolphe Sax Association in 1994, and served in that role until 2004. Beginning 1994, the association has hosted the International Adolphe Sax Competition every 4 years in Dinant, the birthplace of Adolphe Sax. For the competition, Daneels was chairman of the music committee for the 1994, 1998, and 2002 competitions. In January 1999, he was declared Honorary Citizen of the City of Dinant.

Selected discography 
 Concertos for Saxophone, Decca 173018 (1960)  
1. "Double Concerto for Alto, Saxophone, Piano, and Orchestra," Op. 34 (1946), Raymomd Chevreuille, composer
 Daneels, saxophone; Marcel Gazelle, piano; Orchestre national de Belgique; Raymomd Chevreuille (1901–1976), conductor
2. "Divertimento for Saxophone Quartet and Orchestra," Op. 86, Jean Absil, composer
 Belgium Saxophone Quartet; Orchestre national de Belgique; René Defossez, conductor
3. "Piano Concerto No. 2," Jean Louël
 Philibert Mees (1929–2006), piano; Orchestre national de Belgique; René Defossez, conductor
 Saxophone en Concert, Zéphyr Records (Brussels) (1974) 
 Saxo-Retro, Zéphyr Records (Brussels) (1974) 
 Kaleidosax, Horizon Records (Tucson, Arizona) (1992) 
 The Classical Saxophone, Decca Records (1975) 
 Récital de clarinette; Récital de saxophone; Quatuor Belge de Saxophones, Alpha Records (Paris) (1973) 
 François Daneels, soloist on tracks 4 & 6, Buffet Crampon 
 Track 4: "Suite," for saxophone, André Waignein (composer)
 Track 6: J.S. Bach
 Récital de saxophone
 "Fantaisie caprice," Op. 152, Jean Absil (1971), Daneels (soloist)
 "Sisyphus 1971," William P. Latham (1971), Daneels (soloist)
 "Variations," Pierre Max Dubois, Belgium Saxophone Quartet 
 Oeuvres de Jean Absil Decca Records (195?) 
 Track 4: "Batterie," opus 29 (1937), text by Jean Cocteau, Daneels (soloist) 
 François Daneels, alto saxophone, Harmonia Mundi (no date) 
 Westvlaams Orkest, Dirk Varendonck, conductor
 "Ballade pour saxo, alto et archets," Marcel Poot
 "Divertimento pour petit orchestre," Marcel Poot

Compositions dedicated to Daneels 
 "Fantaisie Caprice," for saxophone and orchestra, Op. 152, Jean Absil (1970) 
 "A Tribute to Sax," for saxophone and concert band, Alain Crépin (1993); piano version

Notable students 
 Elie Apper
 Fabrizio Cassol
 Alain Crépin
 John Giordano
 Norbert H. J. Nozy
 Marco Pütz (nl) (born 1958)
 Noël Samyn (fr)

References 

1921 births
2010 deaths
Belgian classical musicians
Belgian conductors (music)
Belgian male musicians
Male conductors (music)
Classical saxophonists
People from Tubize
20th-century saxophonists